Flowering Plants: Evolution Above the Species Level is a book written by evolutionary biologist and botanist G. Ledyard Stebbins which was first published in 1974.

References

Bibliography 

 

1974 non-fiction books
Belknap Press books
Books about evolution
Botany books